Doshman Ziari Rural District may refer to:
 Doshman Ziari Rural District (Fars Province)
 Doshman Ziari Rural District (Kohgiluyeh and Boyer-Ahmad Province)